Myagrus irroratus is a species of beetle in the family Cerambycidae, and the type species of its genus. It was described by Heller in 1924, originally under the genus Xoes. It is known from the Philippines.

References

Lamiini
Beetles described in 1924